Martín Calvo de Encalada y Recabarren (January 7, 1756 – July 2, 1828) was a Chilean politician who participated as a member of Congress during the Chilean War of Independence.

Biography
Martín Calvo Encalada was born in Santiago, the son of Manuel Calvo de Encalada Chacón, second Marquis of Villa Palma, and of Margarita de Racabarren Pardo de Figueroa. He joined the Spanish Army, and was a "maestre de campo" and a Lieutenant of the Cavalry Regiment of the Princess.  He was integral of the First Junta of the Government of the Kingdom 1810 to 1811, and one of the strongest proponents of the independence of the country.

He was part of the First National Congress of 1811 (July 4–20, 1811) as a deputy for Talca and Curicó, and was elected its vice president. On August 11, 1811 he was elected president of the Provisional Executive Authority. After the Disaster of Rancagua he didn't try to emigrate to Argentina, staying in Chile and being incarcerated on the Juan Fernández Islands. Liberated from his captivity, he continued collaborating with the emancipation cause in Chile, integrating himself in 1818 to the Senado Conservador as a Senator, occupying the position until 1822. He became part of the Council of State in 1823 in capacity of a Councilor. He died in Santiago, at the age of 72.

Sources

See also
Manuel Blanco Encalada
Ventura Blanco Encalada

External links
Official biography 

1756 births
1828 deaths
Members of the Senate of Chile
Chilean people of Basque descent
Members of the Chamber of Deputies of Chile
People of the Chilean War of Independence